John Pierson, known also by the stage name Jughead and by the pseudonym Ian Pierce, is an American musician, writer, actor, and podcaster.

Biography
In 1986, Pierson and Ben Weasel co-founded the punk rock band Screeching Weasel in Chicago, Illinois. Pierson played guitar for the band until 2006.

In 2002, Pierson formed the acoustic pop-punk band Even in Blackouts, with which he has recorded four albums and one EP and toured several times.

Pierson is also a playwright and novelist, usually writing under the name Ian Pierce. He formed a theater production company, Hope And Nonthings, in 1990 and produced ten plays before joining the Neo-Futurists; he has been performing in their long-running show Too Much Light Makes the Baby Go Blind since 1996.

His semi-fictitious Weasels in a Box (2005) is a novelization of Screeching Weasel's history. His last novel, Last Temptation of Clarence Odbody, appeared in October 2011.

References

External links 
Jughead's Basement Podcast

Year of birth missing (living people)
Living people
American punk rock guitarists
Guitarists from Chicago
American male guitarists
Screeching Weasel members